Mladotice is a municipality and village in Plzeň-North District in the Plzeň Region of the Czech Republic. It has about 600 inhabitants.

Administrative parts
Villages of Černá Hať, Chrášťovice and Strážiště are administrative parts of Mladotice.

History
The first written mention of Mladotice is from 1115.

References

Villages in Plzeň-North District